New Jersey elected its members October 10, 1826.

See also 
 1826 and 1827 United States House of Representatives elections
 List of United States representatives from New Jersey

1826
New Jersey
United States House of Representatives